Rahang is a suburb of Seremban in Negeri Sembilan, Malaysia. It is an industrial and business area.

Education 
 Sekolah Menengah Kebangsaan Bukit Mewah

References

Seremban